is a board arcade video game developed by ADK and originally published by SNK on September 28, 1995, before being ported to the Neo Geo CD the same year. It was ported in a scaled-down version to the Neo Geo Pocket and later given improved graphics on the Neo Geo Pocket Color. It was only released in Japan.

Gameplay 

Syougi no Tatsujin is a Japanese style chess game. In single player mode the player must compete against computerized opponents (represented by a digitized photograph) to win the tournament. In two player mode, each player competes against each another.

Development

Release

Reception 

In Japan, Game Machine listed Shōgi no Tatsujin: Master of Syougi on their November 1, 1995 issue as being the twelfth most-successful arcade game of the month, outperforming titles such as Voltage Fighter Gowcaizer.

Notes

References

External links 
 Shōgi no Tatsujin: Master of Syougi at GameFAQs
 Shōgi no Tatsujin: Master of Syougi at Killer List of Videogames
 Shōgi no Tatsujin: Master of Syougi at MobyGames

1995 video games
ADK (company) games
Arcade video games
Multiplayer and single-player video games
Neo Geo games
Neo Geo CD games
Neo Geo Pocket games
Neo Geo Pocket Color games
Japan-exclusive video games
Shogi video games
SNK games
Video games scored by Hideki Yamamoto
Video games scored by Keiichiro Segawa
Video games scored by Takao Oshima
Video games developed in Japan